Sylvia Spruck Wrigley (born 7 March 1968) is an American/German writer of science fiction and fantasy, and aviation non-fiction. She grew up in Los Angeles and Germany. She is currently resident in Tallinn, Estonia.

Wrigley's short story "Alive, Alive Oh", published in the June 2013 issue of Lightspeed Magazine, was a nominee for the 2013 Nebula Award for Best Short Story. She has written bespoke near-future science fiction for Thales Group and NATO and serialised fiction at Serial Box.

Aviation
Sylvia Spruck Wrigley is a pilot and an aviation author who has written several books on aviation.

Aviation bibliography 
 "Without a Trace: 1970–2016", May 2019
 "Without a Trace: 1881–1968", March 2018 
 "The Mystery of Malaysia Flight 370", May 2014
 "Why Planes Crash: Case Notes 2001", May 2013
 "You Fly Like A Woman", December 2011
 "Monthly column in Piper Flyer", 2007–2008

Aviation media appearances 
 Air Crash Investigation Season 21, 2021
 Aircrash Confidential Series 2, 2012 and Series 3, 2018
 Channel One Russia 30 March 2014: Спасатели вновь изменили район поиска пропавшего малазийского "Боинга" US-friendly link of video
  M6 (TV channel) 5 March 2015: Disparition du vol MH370
 NTV (Russia) 28 March 2015: Центральное телевидение

Science fiction and fantasy author

Selected stories in online magazines 
 "Hoist by her own Picard" Nature, 2021
 Two lists..." Daily SF, 2017
 "Project Daffodil" Nature, 2016
 "Domnall and the Borrowed Child", a Tor.Com Novella, November 2015
 "Alienated" Nature Physics, October 2014
 "Space Travel Loses its Allure When You’ve Lost Your Moon Cup" Crossed Genres, July 2014
 "Regarding Your Unexpected Visit to the Surface of an Apparently Only Mostly Uninhabited Planet" Daily SF, January 2014
 "I've Been Hacked", Daily SF, January 2014
 "A Letter from Your Mother", Daily SF, January 2014
 "Alive, Alive Oh", Lightspeed, June 2013
 "When the Selkie Comes", Daily SF, September 2013
 "Vintage Millennial Cookery InfoManual by the Geusian Ladies Society", Crossed Genres, May 2013
 "The Front Line", Nature, May 2013
  "Old Flames", Daily SF, November 2012
 "Looking for a Knight in Shining Armor", Daily SF, November 2011
 "Plague of Locusts", Unlikely Story, 2011

References

External links
 Sylvia Spruck Wrigley's Home Page
 Sylvia Spruck Wrigley's Aviation Blog

Sylvia Spruck Wrigley at Free Speculative Fiction Online

American science fiction writers
Living people
American women short story writers
American short story writers
1968 births
Women science fiction and fantasy writers
American women novelists
21st-century American women